Jätkäjätkät is a Finnish hip hop, rap and reggae band fronted by Asa (real name Matti Salo), a well-known Finnish rapper. Initially, the formation toured as "Asa ja Jätkäjätkät" (Asa and Jätkäjätkät) before settling on just the name Jätkäjätkät. The 9-member band has released three studio albums starting with their debut Ykstoist ykstoist on 19 May 2010. The band is signed to Roihis Musika label.

Members
Asa – rapper
Puppa J – guitar, vocals
Joska Josafat – guitar, bouzouki, vocals
Rasmus Pailos – accordion, percussions, vocals
Erno Haukkala – trombone, flute
Kim Rantala – keyboards, accordion, vocals
Ville Väätäinen – drums
Pekka Varmo – percussion, rap
Antti Kivimäki – bass
Former members
Kari Hulkkonen	– bass
Jocke Bachman – drums

Discography

Studio albums

Videography
2010: "Joku saa tietää"
2010: "Flygareita"
2010: "Hutunkeitto"
2011: "Mammona"
2011: "Uusi moottoritie"
2012: "Saan mä elää?!"
2012: "Levon helmi"

References

External links
MySpace

Finnish hip hop groups